LIDS or lids may refer to:

MIT Laboratory for Information and Decision Systems, an interdisciplinary research laboratory of MIT, Cambridge, Massachusetts
Linux Intrusion Detection System, a patch to the Linux kernel
Lids (store), a store specializing in caps, owned by Hat World
Low Impact Docking System, a space vehicle mating system designed by NASA
"Lids", an episode of the television series Zoboomafoo

See also 
Lid (disambiguation)